This List of Chernihiv full list of Sport Complex:

References

Ukraine sport-related lists